The Valea Nesecată is a left tributary of the river Gepiu in Romania. It flows into the Gepiu near the village Gepiu.

References

Rivers of Romania
Rivers of Bihor County